Thabazimbi Local Municipality is an administrative area in the Waterberg District of Limpopo in South Africa.  The seat of Thabazimbi Local Municipality is Thabazimbi.

Thabazimbi is a sotho nguni name meaning "iron ore mountain". The early bantu communities (sotho,venda, kalanga, nguni and Nyasa) worked on this mountain to mine iron.

Main places
The 2001 census divided the municipality into the following main places:

Politics 
The municipal council consists of twenty-three members elected by mixed-member proportional representation. Twelve councillors are elected by first-past-the-post voting in twelve wards, while the remaining eleven are chosen from party lists so that the total number of party representatives is proportional to the number of votes received. In the election of 3 August 2016, the African National Congress (ANC) lost its majority on the council.  Midah Moselane of the Thabazimbi Residents Association subsequently was elected mayor with support from the Democratic Alliance (DA), the Economic Freedom Fighters (EFF), and the Freedom Front Plus (FF+).

The following table shows the results of the election.

References

External links 
 Official homepage

Local municipalities of the Waterberg District Municipality